Juan Habisail Diaz (born December 12, 1988) is a Dominican former professional baseball shortstop. He signed as a non-drafted free agent on April 20, 2006 by Seattle Mariners and he played in Major League Baseball (MLB) for the Cleveland Indians in 2012.

Professional career

Seattle Mariners
In 2006, his first professional season, Díaz batted .191 in 178 at-bats for the Dominican Summer League Mariners. He drove in 23 runs and had an on-base percentage of .324. He played shortstop for 44 of 47 games and 3 games at third base.

Díaz began the 2007 season with the Class-A High Desert Mavericks appearing in six games. He was transferred to the Peoria Mariners on May 24 and then the Single-A Wisconsin Timber Rattlers on June 4. He hit .333 with five runs scored, six doubles and 11 RBIs in 22 games in May. He had season-high 10-game hitting streak, hitting .375 from June 21–30. Díaz took part in the Mariners 2007 Arizona Fall League playing for the Peoria Javelinas.

He spent the 2008 season with Wisconsin, appearing in 122 games. He recorded five hit streaks of five or more game, including a season-high seven-game hit streak from June 19–25. He recorded 22 multi-hit games, including four season-high three-hit games. Díaz participated in the Mariners Advance Development League in Peoria.

Díaz split the 2009 season with the Mavericks and the Peoria Mariners. During his time with Peoria he compiled three hits in three at-bats with one home run. With the Mavericks he hit .311 with 101 hits, four home runs and 29 RBIs in 84 games. He was a California League Mid-Season All-Star in his best offensive season to date.

Cleveland Indians
On June 26, 2010 Diaz was traded to the Cleveland Indians along with Ezequiel Carrera for Russell Branyan.

The Indians purchased Díaz's contract on November 18, 2011. Díaz was called up to the Indians on May 25, 2012.

On June 4, 2013, Diaz was called up from the Triple-A Columbus Clippers to fill in for All-Star shortstop Asdrúbal Cabrera who had been put on the 15-day DL earlier that day.  He was optioned back to Columbus on June 11 when John McDonald was activated. He was designated for assignment on September 1.

Miami Marlins
Díaz signed a minor league deal with the Miami Marlins on January 9, 2014.

Chicago White Sox
Díaz signed a minor league deal with the Chicago White Sox on January 22, 2015. He was released on April 12, 2015.

Second stint with Marlins
He signed a minor league deal with the Miami Marlins on April 14, 2015.

Pittsburgh Pirates
Díaz signed a minor league deal with the Pittsburgh Pirates in January 2016. He became a free agent on November 7, 2016.

References

External links

1988 births
Living people
Akron Aeros players
Arizona League Mariners players
Bristol Pirates players
Cleveland Indians players
Columbus Clippers players
Dominican Republic expatriate baseball players in the United States
High Desert Mavericks players
Kinston Indians players

Major League Baseball players from the Dominican Republic
Major League Baseball shortstops
New Orleans Zephyrs players
Peoria Javelinas players
Wisconsin Timber Rattlers players
Águilas Cibaeñas players
Dominican Summer League Mariners players
Estrellas Orientales players